Major-General Sir Frederick Barton Maurice,  (19 January 1871 – 19 May 1951) was a British Army officer, military correspondent, writer and academic. During the First World War he was forced to retire from the army in May 1918 after writing a letter to The Times criticizing Prime Minister David Lloyd George for making misleading statements about the strength of British forces on the Western Front. He also later founded the British Legion in 1920, and served as its president from 1932 to 1947.

Early life and military career
Maurice was born in Dublin, the son of John Maurice, a British Army officer and military historian, and his wife Anne Frances "Annie" FitzGerald. He attended St. Paul's School and Sandhurst before joining the Derbyshire Regiment in 1892. His first overseas posting was to British India in 1897–98, during the Tirah Campaign. During this time, he served as aide-de-camp to his father, Major-General John Frederick Maurice. After a promotion to captain in 1899, Maurice fought with the Sherwood Foresters (Derbyshire Regiment) in the Second Boer War 1899–1901.  

Before leaving for South Africa, he married Margaret Helen Marsh (1874-1942), the daughter of Frederick Howard Marsh, and the sister of Edward Marsh, in 1899 at St George's, Hanover Square.

Maurice was promoted brevet major in November 1900.
On returning from South Africa, he entered the Staff College at Camberley in 1902. Later that year, he was posted to the War Office, where he worked under Douglas Haig. His daughter Joan was born in 1903. 

He was promoted to the substantive rank of major on 19 May 1911, and two years later was promoted to lieutenant colonel and transferred to the Staff College as an instructor in military history under Robertson, then Commandant.

First World War

On the outbreak of war in 1914, Maurice was posted to France and assigned to 3rd Infantry Division as a staff officer. He saw action at the Battle of Mons in August 1914. In early 1915 Maurice was posted to London as Director of Military Operations for the Imperial General Staff, and in 1916 he was promoted to major general.

Maurice worked closely with William Robertson, who was appointed Chief of the Imperial General Staff at the end of 1915, ghostwriting many papers which went out over Robertson's signature.

One of Maurice's daughters, Nancy, was the long-term secretary and mistress of Edward Spears, eventually marrying him in 1969 after the death of his first wife Mary Borden. Spears later wrote of Maurice in Prelude to Victory "As imperturbable as a fish, always unruffled … a rather abrupt manner. A little distrait owing to great inner concentration, he simply demolished work, never forgot anything … [a] most efficient if not outwardly brilliant second. No man ever wasted fewer words nor expressed himself when he spoke with greater clarity and conciseness".

John Grigg suggests that Maurice inherited something of the inner turmoil and rebelliousness of his grandfather, the Victorian divine Frederick Denison Maurice.

Resignation

Following the removal of Robertson in February 1918, Henry Wilson, the new CIGS, proposed that Maurice be given command of a division.

Maurice became convinced that troops were being withheld from the Western Front in order to undermine the position of Douglas Haig. The situation became particularly tense after the near catastrophic defeat of Hubert Gough's Fifth Army in late March 1918. When David Lloyd George announced in the House of Commons on 9 April that British troop levels on the Western Front were at all-time highs, Maurice believed that he was deceiving both Parliament and the British public.

Whilst waiting to hand over his job as DMO to Maj Gen P de B Radcliffe, Maurice visited Haig, who offered him not command of a division but a staff post in the new Army being rebuilt from the wreck of the Fifth. Maurice never explained why he declined the offer, although he recorded (15 April) that officers at Haig’s staff were dissatisfied with Lloyd George’s speech of 9 April. Maurice later claimed not to have read Lloyd George’s speech of 9 April until "his attention was drawn to it" whilst in France, 13–16 April. Lloyd George’s speech of 9 April had been widely reported in the press and was being discussed by officers at Haig’s headquarters, so it seems unlikely, in Grigg’s view, that he could have been unaware of it.

Maurice's baby daughter Betty had died, aged not quite one, on 16 March (not mentioned in Nancy Maurice’s 1950s book about her father). He was disappointed at being sacked as DMO and at Haig not offering him the division he had been promised.

In his capacity as Director of Military Operations, Maurice knew that the troop statistics available to his office did not bear out Lloyd George's claims. He wrote to Robertson's successor Henry Wilson on 30 April, to outline his position. Wilson did not respond. Hankey later told Liddell Hart in 1932 that he had a friendly conversation with Maurice on the eve of his press letter, telling him that Lloyd George thought highly of him and suggesting a number of suitable jobs for him; Grigg speculates that the conversation might have been at Wilson’s behest after Maurice’s letter to Wilson, and that the staff post in France (which he had been offered on 15 April) might have been one of the mooted jobs.

Maurice composed his press letter on 2 May but did not yet send it. Robertson wrote to him on 4 May, writing that not too much credence should be given to imminent predictions of Lloyd George’s downfall, that Maurice should take especial care to get his facts exactly right, and adding: "You are contemplating a great thing – to your undying credit". Maurice wrote a letter to The Times and other newspapers, criticizing Lloyd George for misleading the public about the state of the British Expeditionary Force during the German spring offensive. The publication of this letter on 7 May caused a political storm, and members of the Liberal opposition, including former Prime Minister H. H. Asquith, called for a debate. This subsequently occurred on 9 May, and Lloyd George was able to imply that the source of confusion was, in fact, Maurice's office, rather than the Prime Minister's.

Maurice was put on half-pay on 11 May, and was soon "retired" from the Army. He was also denied a court martial. However, he was far from disgraced and soon became military correspondent of the Daily Chronicle. He had a friendly exchange of letters with Lord Milner, Secretary of State for War (16 May) in which he agreed to exercise self-censorship in view of the secret information to which he was party. He was also later a military correspondent for the Daily News.

Postwar life
In 1919, the reviews in the German press that misrepresented his book, The Last Four Months, contributed to the creation of the stab-in-the-back myth. "Ludendorff made use of the reviews to convince Hindenburg."

Maurice was never formally exonerated for his role in May 1918. He wrote his own secret account of the incident on 22 May 1918, not published until his daughter Nancy’s book in the 1950s. In 1920 Arthur Balfour declined to assist him in getting to the bottom of the statistical dispute, pointing out that while Lloyd George might not have "measured his language" in the debate, he regarded himself as being victim of "a wrong" (in that he had on 9 April, in good faith, presented to the House of Commons figures given to him, and that various different sets of figures had subsequently been produced from the War Office whilst elements in the military attempted to discredit him).

In 1921, Maurice was one of the founders of the British Legion, and although he was not initially very active in the organization, he would later serve as the president from 1932 to 1947.

In 1922 Maurice was appointed principal of the Working Men's College in London, an institution founded by his grandfather. He held this position until 1933. Cabinet Secretary Maurice Hankey had a low opinion of the military's disingenuous use of statistics and took pride in having assisted Lloyd George in preparing his speech of 9 May 1918. He may well have used his influence in 1925 to block Maurice from becoming Chichele Professor of the History of War at Oxford University (the post went to Ernest Swinton). However, Maurice was appointed Professor of Military Studies at the University of London in 1926, and taught both there and at Trinity College, Cambridge until the end of his life. In 1933 he became principal of East London College.

In his memoirs in the mid 1930s Lloyd George was harsh about Maurice and did not come clean about his own disingenuous use of statistics in the debate (i.e. relying on the figures with which the military had supplied him on 9 April and 18 April, and ignoring the more accurate figures which the military had subsequently produced).

During the Munich Crisis, Maurice volunteered the services of the Legion to the government. He flew to Berlin to meet Hitler for the formation of the short-lived British Legion Volunteer Police Force. Three days before war commenced on 1 September 1939, Maurice, as President of the British Legion, broadcast an appeal to Hitler urging him not to invade Poland, an action which John Grigg attributes to naivety.

Maurice died on 19 May 1951, in Cambridge well cared for by his daughter, the economist Joan Robinson.

Publications
 The Russo-Turkish War, 1877–1878 (Special Campaign Series, 1905)
 Sir Frederick Maurice: a record of his work and opinions (Edward Arnold, London, 1913)
 Forty Days in 1914 (Constable and Co, London, 1919)
 The Last Four Months (Cassell and Co, London, 1919)
 The Life of Lord Wolseley (William Heinemann, London, 1924)
 Robert E. Lee, the soldier (Constable and Co, London, 1925)
 Governments and War (William Heinemann, London, 1926)
 An aide-de-camp of Lee (Little, Brown and Co, London, 1927)
 The Life of General Lord Rawlinson of Trent (Cassell and Co, London, 1928)
 British Strategy (Constable and Co, London, 1929)
 The 16th Foot (Constable and Co, London, 1931)
 The History of the Scots Guards (Chatto and Windus, London, 1934)
 Haldane (Faber and Faber, London, 1937, 1939)
 The Armistices of 1918 (Oxford University Press, London, 1943)
 The Adventures of Edward Wogan (G Routledge and Sons, London, 1945)

Notes

Bibliography

References

Biography of Frederick Maurice at First World War.com
Biography of Frederick Maurice at the Centre for World War I studies at the University of Birmingham
Liddell Hart Centre for Military Archives
Biography of Frederick Maurice at Spartacus Educational

1871 births
1951 deaths
Military personnel from Dublin (city)
People educated at St Paul's School, London
Graduates of the Royal Military College, Sandhurst
British military writers
British military personnel of the Tirah campaign
British Army personnel of the Second Boer War
British Army generals of World War I
People associated with Queen Mary University of London
Irish knights
Companions of the Order of the Bath
Knights Commander of the Order of St Michael and St George
Graduates of the Staff College, Camberley
Academics of the Staff College, Camberley
British biographers